The Uthura Rudras was a franchise cricket team that took part in Sri Lanka Premier League, representing Northern Province. Rudra Sports Private Limited purchased the team for $3.4 million in 2012. They was owned for seven years, after which a new agreement may be negotiated.

History
This Team was previously known as Uthura oryxes and was captained 
by Daniel Vettori.

Current squad
Players with international caps are listed in bold.

 
Haris Sohail joined Uthura after the tournament had started

References

External links
Team site on ESPN CricInfo

Sri Lanka Premier League teams
Sports clubs in Sri Lanka
Cricket clubs established in 2012
Cricket clubs disestablished in 2012
2012 establishments in Sri Lanka
Cricket in Dambulla
Sport in Dambulla